The 1981 FINA Men's Water Polo World Cup was the second edition of the event, organised by the world's governing body in aquatics, the International Swimming Federation (FINA). The event took place in Long Beach, United States. The eight participating teams played a round robin to decide the second ever winner of what would be a bi-annual event until 1999.

Results matrix

Final standings

Final ranking

References

1981
F
W
1981